Paracleocnemis is a genus of Argentinian running crab spiders that was first described by R. D. Schiapelli & B. S. Gerschman in 1942.  it contains only two species, found only in Argentina: P. apostoli and P. termalis.

See also
 List of Philodromidae species

References

Araneomorphae genera
Philodromidae
Spiders of Argentina